Poush is the 9th month of both the Bengali calendar and the Nepali calendar. It overlaps December and January of the Gregorian calendar. It is the first month of the winter season. This month marks the start of Winter (Sheat) in the Bengali calendar.

Etymology 
This month is named after the star Pushya.

Culture 
During Poush crops are harvested and farmers often have ample food and income. Bengali people celebrate Poush Sankranti as one of their festival on the last day of Poush. They make Pitha at their homes and share those among each others. Bangladesh Poush Mela Udjapon Parishad organises a three-day fair in Dhaka, Bangladesh.

In his novel Ganadevata, the noted Bengali writer Tarashankar Bandopadhyay quotes a rural rhyme:
Poush-Poush, golden Poush,
Come Poush but don't go away, don't ever leave,
Don't leave Poush, don't,
The husband and son will eat a full bowl of rice.

Observances marked (per official use in Bangladesh) 
 Poush 1 - Victory day of Bangladesh
 Poush 9 - Christmas Eve
 Poush 10 - Christmas
 Poush 11 - Boxing Day
 Poush 17 - New Year's Day
 Poush 22 - Traditional Epiphany and Armenian Christmas
 Poush 23 - Christmas according to the Julian Calendar
 Poush 31 - Poush Sankranti

References

Months of the Bengali calendar
Nepali calendar